is a town located in Kimotsuki District, Kagoshima Prefecture, Japan.

Demographics
As of 2005, the town has an estimated population of 7,122 and in 2003 the density was measured at 265.22 persons per km². The total area is 27.69 km². Approximately 2,367 of the residents are elderly or senior citizens, while 877 children live in Higashikushira. Slightly more than half of the population (3,771 people) are women. As of 2005 (Heisei 平成 17) there are 3,265 households in Higashikushira. Over the last 20 years the population has decreased by about 1,000 people, down from 8,119 in 1991.

Geography
Higashikushira is located on the east coast of the Ōsumi Peninsula in Kagoshima Prefecture. While the town itself is located on flat land, it is bordered to the south by mountains and to the east by Shibushi Bay. The highest point, at 77.5 meters above sea level, is on the Iwahiro Plateau, located in the northern portion of the town. The lay of the land is such that, from north to south, the elevation gradually declines.

The climate is subtropical with an average high temperature of 32 degrees Celsius in the summer and an average winter low of 0 degrees.

History
The area of present-day Higashikushira was first settled by peoples of the Jōmon and Yayoi cultures in the prehistoric period. Numerous archaeological sites in the town date from this period, including the "Tōjinkofun," the ancient tomb of Tojin.

Higashikushira was classified as a village until October 1, 1932, when it was re-classified as a town. Despite the recent national trend of towns and cities merging to form larger administrative units, the residents of Higashikushira voted to remain an independent township. Although various proposals were discussed, ranging from a merger with several local towns to absorption into the greater Kanoya city area, residents declined all options in favor of retaining local administration.

Agriculture and Industry

Agriculture, fishing and animal husbandry comprise the greatest portion of Higashikushira's economic activity. Higashikushira produces Japanese radishes (daikon 大根), rice, goyas, tomatoes, Satsuma sweet potatoes (Satsuma imo 薩摩芋) and is famous for its green peppers.

As of 2005, 1816 people worked in agriculture, including 816 full-time farmers.

Events, Places of Interest and Persons of Note
There are 132 archaeological sites in Higashikushira, dating from the prehistoric Jōmon and Yayoi periods. Among the most famous is the "Ancient Tomb of Tojin" (Tōjinkofun). Archaeological digs and research are an ongoing process in the town.

Among the town's 'famous sons' are Setoue Kenjiro and Kiyoshi Nakakura. Setoue Kenjiro was a noted doctor in Japan, while Nakakura Kiyoshi was a kendo master who traveled as far as Brazil in his efforts to promote the martial art.

Public Institutions

The Higashikushira town office (yakuba 役場) is located in the Kawanishi (川西) section of town. The town also has four medical clinics, four fire brigades and two small police stations (kōban 交番). There is also the Sogo sentā, a town cultural center, a town gymnasium and a public athletic field.

Education

There are three preschools, one kindergarten, two elementary schools and one junior high school in Higashikushira. These are all managed through the Town Board of Education (Kyōikuiinkai 教育委員会).

Junior High (Chūgakkō 中学校)

Higashikushira's Junior High School was founded in 1947 and had 792 students by 1962. Currently 160 students are attending the school in three grades.

The school sports teams include soccer, tennis, karate, basketball, judo, kendo, baseball and volleyball. There is also a student brass band. Notably, the basketball team won the Ōsumi Girls' Basketball Tournament in 2010, making it the top-ranked team in the region.

A number of events are organized at the school in the course of the year, including a sports day, a cultural festival and a chorus contest.

Ikenohara Elementary School (Ikenohara Shōgakkō 池之原小学校)

Ikenohara Elementary School was founded in 1892. There are 229 students currently in attendance, divided into six grades.

The school has eight sports teams, including kendo, volleyball, basketball, soccer and a swimming team. There are also six clubs, music, chemistry and comic illustration clubs among them.

The school's yearly events include a sports day, a marathon, a swimming tournament and an inter-school race.

Kashiwabaru Elementary School (Kashiwabaru Shōgakkō 柏原小学校)

Kashiwabaru Primary School was founded in 1873. There are currently 117 students in six grades attending the school.

The school has four sports teams: soccer, volleyball, softball and kendo. In 2010 the Kashiwabaru softball team was the top-ranked team in Kagoshima Prefecture. Students also participate in science and music clubs.

The school hosts a number of events for the students, including a field day and marathon.

Ikenohara Kindergarten (Ikenohara Yōchien 池之原幼稚園)

Eighteen children, aged three to six years, currently attend Ikenohara Kindergarten. Here they learn how to count, write hiragana script and acquire basic English skills. Among the highlights of the school year are a dance recital, a sports festival and a potato harvest.

Preschools (Hoikuen 保育園)

Higashikushira's three preschools educate children and aid parents during the early developmental years, starting from infancy until age three.

Notes

References
(1980 / Shōwa 昭和 55) 東串良郷土誌 (Higashikushira Historical Record), Kagoshima, Japan: 東串良郷土誌編纂委員会 (Higashikushira Historical Record Compilation Committee)
(2010)  町勢要覧　2010年 (Town Census Report, 2010), Higashikushira, Japan: 役場企画課　(Town Hall Planning Section)
http://www.japan-zone.com/omnibus/climate.shtml (Information concerning climate and weather)

External links

Higashikushira official website 

Towns in Kagoshima Prefecture